Lisandro de la Torre is a barrio (traditional neighborhood) in the north-east of Rosario, Argentina. It carries the name of a renowned local politician, Lisandro de la Torre (1868–1939), but is most commonly referred to as Arroyito.

It is a primarily commercial zone, delimited by Alberdi Avenue and the Paraná River (to the north lies Barrio Alberdi). It includes the Parque Alem, one of Rosario's major urban parks, the Gigante de Arroyito Stadium (home of local football team Rosario Central), and the mouth of the Ludueña Stream, as well as the Municipal Aquarium.

Notable people
 Juan Enrique Hayes (1891-1976), international footballer, was born in Arroyito

Lisandro de la Torre